Jason Regier (born 1975) is an American Paralympic wheelchair rugby player and eight-time gold medalist from Denver, Colorado. In 2005, he participated at the IWAS World Games where he won a gold medal and next year won three more at the North American Cup, Canada Cup and World championships. After the 2008 North American Cup where he won silver for the first time, he continued winning gold ever since at various championships until 2012 Summer Paralympics where he won his first bronze. Jason is a member of Sigma Alpha Epsilon as an undergraduate at Oregon State University.  He also has a master's degree in business administration and marketing from University of Colorado.

References

1975 births
Living people
Paralympic wheelchair basketball players of the United States
Paralympic gold medalists for the United States
Paralympic bronze medalists for the United States
American wheelchair rugby players
Sportspeople from Denver
University of Colorado alumni
Medalists at the 2012 Summer Paralympics
Wheelchair rugby players at the 2008 Summer Paralympics
Wheelchair rugby players at the 2012 Summer Paralympics
Medalists at the 2008 Summer Paralympics
Paralympic medalists in wheelchair rugby